Doibani I (Doibany) is a commune in the Dubăsari District of Transnistria, Moldova. It is composed of three villages: Coicova (Койковe, Койково), Doibani I and Doibani II. It has since 1990 been administered as a part of the breakaway Pridnestrovian Moldavian Republic (PMR).

References

Communes of Transnistria
Kherson Governorate
Dubăsari District, Transnistria